The 1924 UCI Road World Championships took place in Versailles, France on 2 August 1924.

Events summary 

France won the nations classification (total time of the first four riders per nation) ahead of Italy and Switzerland.

Medal table

Results
The course was 180 km.

See also
 1924 UCI Track Cycling World Championships

References

UCI Road World Championships by year
W
R
International cycle races hosted by France
August 1924 sports events